Gregor Tarkovič (19 November 1754 – 16 January 1841) was a Slovak Greek Catholic hierarch. He was the first bishop of the new created Slovak Catholic Eparchy of Prešov from 1818 to 1841.

Born in Pasika, Kingdom of Hungary (present day – Ukraine) in the Ruthenian family in 1754, he was ordained a priest on 1 January 1779 for the Ruthenian Catholic Eparchy of Mukacheve. He was confirmed as the first Bishop of the new created Eparchy by the Holy See on 2 October 1818. He was consecrated to the Episcopate on 17 June 1821. The principal consecrator was Bishop Oleksiy Povchiy.

He died in Prešov on 16 January 1841.

References 

1754 births
1841 deaths
People from Zakarpattia Oblast
19th-century Eastern Catholic bishops
Slovak Greek Catholic bishops